Sainte-Angèle-de-Mérici is a municipality in Quebec, Canada.

See also 
 List of municipalities in Quebec

References

External links 
 

Municipalities in Quebec
Designated places in Quebec
Incorporated places in Bas-Saint-Laurent